The 1907–08 Trinity Blue and White's basketball team represented Trinity College (later renamed Duke University) during the 1907-08 men's college basketball season. The head coach was Wilbur Wade Card and the team finished with an overall record of 2–3.

Schedule

|-

References

Duke Blue Devils men's basketball seasons
Duke
1907 in sports in North Carolina
1908 in sports in North Carolina